Dangerously may refer to:

 "Dangerously" (song), by Charlie Puth on Nine Track Mind (2016)
 Jesse Dangerously (born 1979), a Canadian alternative hip hop artist
 Johnny Dangerously, a fictional character

See also

 Dangerous (disambiguation)